The Granger Homestead and Carriage Museum offers an 1816 Federal-style mansion in Canandaigua, New York. The property remained in the Granger family for four generations.  A carriage house contains a carriage museum.

Two barns on the  hold close to 100 antique carriages and sleighs. One barn has a large collection of original Granger family farming equipment.

References

External links
Granger Homestead

Houses completed in 1816
Museums in Ontario County, New York
Transportation museums in New York (state)
Historic house museums in New York (state)
Carriage museums in the United States
Houses in Ontario County, New York
1816 establishments in New York (state)